2+2 or Two plus two may refer to:

Films
 Two & Two (2011 film), a 2011 Iranian short film
 2+2 (2012 film), a 2012 Argentine comedy film
 Two+Two (unreleased film), an unreleased Pakistani action comedy film

Music
 2+2 (album), a 1980 album by the vocal quartet 2+2
 "2 + 2 = 5" (song), a 2003 single by Radiohead
 "2 + 2 = ?", a 1968 anti-Vietnam War song by The Bob Seger System

Transportation
 2+2 road, a high-capacity four-lane road with at-grade intersections
 2+2 (car body style), a car configuration with two rear seats rather than three, for a total of four seats
 Pontiac 2+2, an automobile model produced by the Pontiac Motor Division of General Motors

Other uses
 2+2 (TV channel), a national Ukrainian-language TV channel
 2+2 photocycloaddition, a photochemical reaction
 2 + 2 = 5,  a slogan used in George Orwell's dystopian novel Nineteen Eighty-Four
 Two Plus Two Publishing, a company that publishes books on poker and gambling

See also 
 4 (number)
 2 (disambiguation)
 2/2 (disambiguation)
 Tutu (disambiguation)
 Two two (disambiguation)
 Two by Two (disambiguation)